Judith Roth  (born 31 March 1966) is a German former footballer who played for the Germany women's national football team in 1992. On club level she played for SSG 09 Bergisch Gladbach.

References

External links
 
 Profile at soccerdonna.de

1966 births
Living people
German women's footballers
Place of birth missing (living people)
Germany women's international footballers
Women's association football defenders